Bitterne Park School  is a large mixed secondary comprehensive school in the Bitterne Park suburb of Southampton, Hampshire, in the south of England.

The school last received an Ofsted inspection on 29 and 30 November 2017, in which it was rated 'Good'.

Notable former pupils 

Darren Anderton
Chris Packham
Royston Smith
Jeremy Sochan

References

External links
 The school's website
 The school on Ofsted's website

Educational institutions established in 1995
1995 establishments in England
Secondary schools in Southampton
Foundation schools in Southampton